The Reformed Church in the United States (RCUS) is a Protestant Christian denomination in the United States. The present RCUS is a conservative, Calvinist denomination. It affirms the principles of the Reformation: Sola scriptura (Scripture alone), Solus Christus (Christ alone), Sola gratia (Grace alone), Sola fide (Faith alone), and Soli Deo gloria (Glory to God alone). The RCUS has membership concentrated in the Midwest and California.

History

Originally known as the German Reformed Church, the RCUS was organized in 1725 thanks largely to the efforts of John Philip Boehm, who immigrated in 1720. He organized the first congregation of German Reformed believers near Philadelphia, Pennsylvania, some of them descendants and German immigrants from the turn of the century. Some had immigrated from the Palatine area. He was later joined by other ministers such as George Weiss and Michael Schlatter.

Boehm was eventually ordained by the Classis of Amsterdam in 1729, which oversaw the American branch of the Dutch Reformed Church (now the Reformed Church in America). The German Reformed remained under Dutch Reformed oversight until 1793, when the German Reformed adopted their own constitution. In the 1740s, Count Nicolaus von Zinzendorf, bishop of the Moravian Church, visited Pennsylvania, with the hopes of uniting the German Lutherans and Reformed with the Moravians, which Boehm staunchly resisted.

During the 19th century the German Reformed Church debated issues such as revivalism and especially the Mercersburg Theology of John Nevin and Philip Schaff. In 1866 Samuel Miller, a member of the German Reformed Church, published a work entitled A Treatise on Mercersburg Theology: Mercersburg and Modern Theology Compared. Other controversies, such as debates over liturgy, also occurred in the 19th century. In the second half of the century, the congregations formed their first General Synod, held in 1863. In the 1870s and 1880s, there were attempts, albeit unsuccessful, to unite with the related Dutch Reformed Church.

During the twentieth century, the RCUS increasingly shifted toward ecumenism and higher criticism of the Bible. More conservative clergy and members united to form the Eureka Classis of the RCUS, in order to continue classical Reformed worship and polity.

In 1934, the RCUS merged with the Evangelical Synod of North America (ESNA) to form the Evangelical and Reformed Church. ESNA featured a mix of both Lutheran and Reformed theology, reflecting the Prussian Union of Churches.

The Eureka Classis, however, abjured that merger and decided to identify as the "continuing" Reformed Church in the United States. The classis  objected to the ESNA's admixture of Lutheran teachings with Reformed practices; most of its churches and members had descended from late 19th-century immigration either from parts of Germany where Reformed confessionalism had taken hold, or from the Volga River region of Russia, where ethnic Germans had been isolated from liberalizing influences in the motherland.

By contrast, most RCUS churches, classes, and synods located in the eastern United States had significantly assimilated into generalized or what became known as mainline American Protestantism, and become more ecumenical. The Evangelical and Reformed Church in 1957 merged with the Congregational Christian Churches (which had formed from earlier Congregational and Restorationist churches) to become the United Church of Christ. It has been known for its strongly liberal doctrine and moral stances.

In 1986, the Eureka Classis transitioned to become a synod, currently composed of four classes.

Polity and beliefs
The polity of the RCUS is presbyterian; local congregations elect elders and deacons for guidance. The pastor is the presiding officer of the church council or consistory. The RCUS has around 46 congregations, with about 2,600 communicant members throughout the United States. The congregations are grouped together in four classes: Western Classis, Northern Plains Classis, South Central Classis, Covenant Eastern Classis. A classis is equivalent to a presbytery in Scots-Anglo-Irish Presbyterian denominations. A general, or national, synod convenes annually in mid-spring.

In his 2021 presidents report then president Frank Walker noted that the RCUS has lost 21% of its membership in the previous 19 years.   In his 2022 presidents report Rev Walker called the "negative growth unsustainable" while referring to a 3.7 percent drop in communicant membership in the previous year.

Theology 
The old RCUS, as well as the continuing RCUS, originally held only to the Heidelberg Catechism as its statement of faith. In 1995, the Synod officially adopted the Belgic Confession of Faith and the Canons of Dort, which along with Heidelberg are known as the Three Forms of Unity which are commonly used together by Reformed churches (especially those coming out of the Dutch branch of Reformed churches). By holding strictly to these standards, the RCUS maintains a strong affiliation with Calvinism and the 16th-century Reformation.

The RCUS believes in Biblical inerrancy, including a teaching that Genesis 1:1—2:4 must be understood as a literal 24-hour, six-day creation account. The RCUS also does not allow women to hold special office (elders, deacons, pastor), a stance held by many conservative Reformed or Presbyterian bodies in the United States. In addition, the RCUS rejects some standard positions associated with American fundamentalism such as premillennialism and total abstinence from alcoholic beverages, holding instead a focus on a European Calvinist orthodoxy rather than American-style revivalism.

International organisations
The Reformed Church in the United States is a member of the North American Presbyterian and Reformed Council as well as the International Conference of Reformed Churches.

References

External links

Reformed Church in the United States (RCUS) official website

1725 establishments in the Thirteen Colonies
Reformed denominations in the United States
Religious organizations established in 1725